Brachybotrys is a genus of flowering plants belonging to the family Boraginaceae.

Its native range is Primorye to Korea.

Species:

Brachybotrys paridiformis

References

Boraginaceae
Boraginaceae genera